Tõnu Kõrda (born 19 September 1952 Võru) is an Estonian politician. He was a member of VII Riigikogu.

References

Living people
1952 births
Members of the Riigikogu, 1992–1995
Members of the Riigikogu, 1995–1999
People from Võru